is a Japanese author, best known for writing the light novel The Garden of Sinners and visual novels Tsukihime and Fate/stay night, and a co-founder of Type-Moon. He graduated from Hosei University with a major in human science.

Biography
Together with his junior high school classmate and friend Takashi Takeuchi, Nasu formed Type-Moon in 2000, originally as a dōjin group to create the visual novel Tsukihime, which soon gained immense popularity. His influences include Hideyuki Kikuchi, Yukito Ayatsuji, Soji Shimada, Natsuhiko Kyogoku, Kenji Takemoto, Ken Ishikawa and Yasuhiro Nightow.

After the success of Tsukihime, Type-Moon became a commercial organization. A sequel to Tsukihime, Kagetsu Tohya, was released in August 2001. On 28 January 2004, Type-Moon released Fate/stay night, written by Nasu; it, too, gained great success, becoming one of the most popular visual novels on the day of its release. A sequel to Fate/stay night, Fate/hollow ataraxia, was released on 28 October 2005. Nasu's visual novel work has been adapted to extremely popular manga and anime series.

Works

Among his earlier works are the novels Kara no Kyōkai, originally released in 1998 and re-printed in 2004, Angel Notes, Mahōtsukai no Yoru and Kōri no Hana.

Novels
 Kara no Kyōkai also called Garden of Sinners - originally released in 1998 and re-printed in 2004. It was also re-released in a three-volume format with new illustrations in 2007
 Decoration Disorder Disconnection
 Tsuki no Sango (Moon’s Coral)
 Mahōtsukai no Yoru
 Notes. (Angel Voice)
 
 Clock Tower 2015
 Garden Of Avalon
 Avalon le Fae Synopsys

Visual novels
 Tsukihime (2000)
 Kagetsu Tohya (2001) – Fan-disc of Tsukihime.
 Fate/stay night (2004) 
 Fate/hollow ataraxia (2005) – Fan-disc of Fate/stay night.
 428: Shibuya Scramble (2008) – Nasu wrote a special scenario for the game, with fellow Type-Moon co-founder Takashi Takeuchi providing the character designs. This scenario got a sequel as an anime, Canaan.
 Mahōtsukai no Yoru (2012) – Adaptation of the novel.
 Tsukihime -A piece of blue glass moon- (2021) – Remake of Tsukihime Near-Side Route.
 Tsukihime -The other side of red garden- (TBA) – Remake of Tsukihime Far-Side Route.

Video games
 Melty Blood - Melty Blood Actress Again Current Code (2002 - 2016) – Story dialogue
 Fate/Extra (2010) – Story dialogue
 Fate/Extra CCC (2013) - Storyline Writer
 Fate/Grand Order (2015) - Composition, Screenplay & Supervision
 Fate/Extella (2016) - Storyline Writer
 Fate/Extella Link (2018) - Writer
 Melty Blood: Type Lumina (2021) – Storyline dialogue
 Fate/Extra Record (TBA) – Story dialogue

Anime
 Fate/Grand Order: Moonlight/Lostroom (2017) - Script
 Fate/Extra Last Encore (2018) - Series Composition, Original Concept

Films
 Fate/Grand Order: Camelot - Wandering; Agaterám (2020)
 Fate/Grand Order: Camelot - Paladin; Agaterám (2021)
 Fate/Grand Order Final Singularity - Grand Temple of Time: Solomon (2021)

References

External links
 Kinoko Nasu's and Takashi Takeuchi's official website and online diary  
 Type-Moon's official website 
 Kinoko Nasu manga in Media Arts Database 
 Kinoko Nasu anime listing in Media Arts Database 

1973 births
20th-century Japanese novelists
21st-century Japanese novelists
Anime screenwriters
Dark fantasy writers
Japanese writers
Japanese fantasy writers
Japanese screenwriters
Japanese video game designers
Living people
Type-Moon
Writers of modern Arthurian fiction